John Mighton, OC (born October 2, 1957) is a Canadian mathematician, author, and playwright.

Education and career 

In 1998 Mighton founded a highly successful math tutoring program.  In 2002, based on the methods developed in the tutoring program, he founded JUMP (Junior Undiscovered Math Prodigies) Math, a charitable organization that works to educate students in mathematics, and to promote those methods in the education system. Mighton points out that any child who learns language is capable of learning math.

As a playwright, Mighton has been the recipient of the Siminovitch Prize in Theatre, two Governor General’s Literary Awards for Drama, the Dora Award, and the Chalmers Award. His plays include Possible Worlds, The Little Years, Body & Soul, Scientific Americans, A Short History of Night, and Half Life.

Mighton completed a Ph.D. in mathematics at the University of Toronto and was awarded an NSERC fellowship for postdoctoral research in knot and graph theory. He is a Fellow of the Fields Institute for Research in Mathematical Sciences and has taught mathematics at the University of Toronto. Mighton also lectured in philosophy at McMaster University, where he received a Masters in philosophy.

In 1997, Mighton played an assistant math professor in the critically acclaimed film Good Will Hunting.

Awards and honors 
 10th Annual Egerton Ryerson Award for Dedication to Public Education (2016)
 Schwab Foundation Social Entrepreneur of the Year (2015)
 Ernst & Young Social Entrepreneur of the Year (2014)
 Officer of the Order of Canada [1] (2010)
 Ashoka Fellow (2004)

Publications 
 The Myth of Ability (2003)
 All Things Being Equal: Why Math Is the Key to a Better World (2020)

Filmography
Good Will Hunting (1997): Tom - Lambeau's Teaching Assistant
Hokees (Short Film) (2000)

References

External links

About John Mighton at JUMP Math

Mathematics writers
Living people
1957 births
Officers of the Order of Canada
University of Toronto alumni
Academic staff of the University of Toronto
20th-century Canadian dramatists and playwrights
21st-century Canadian dramatists and playwrights
Canadian mathematicians
Canadian male film actors
Canadian non-fiction writers
Governor General's Award-winning dramatists
Canadian male dramatists and playwrights
Male actors from Hamilton, Ontario
Writers from Hamilton, Ontario
20th-century Canadian male writers
21st-century Canadian male writers
Canadian male non-fiction writers
Ashoka Canada Fellows